Xylindein is a quinone pigment, a dimeric naphthoquinone derivative. It is produced by fungi in the genus Chlorociboria. This pigment causes green staining of wood infected by the fungi.

Etymology

This pigment was firstly extracted in 1868 by Paul Thénard from wood and resembled indigo, so he called it xylindéine. Combination of xyl- (wood) and indé (indigo) + -ine.

References

External links 
 

Biological pigments
Heterocyclic compounds with 7 or more rings
Natural phenol dimers
Dihydroisocoumarins
Pyrans
Hydroxyarenes
3-Hydroxypropenals within hydroxyquinones
Polyenes
Naphthoquinones